The 1958 United States Senate elections in Arizona took place on November 4, 1958. Incumbent Republican U.S. Senator Barry Goldwater ran for reelection to a second term, and defeated former U.S. Senator, and then-Governor, Ernest McFarland in the general election. The election was a rematch from 1952, where Goldwater defeated McFarland by a narrow margin. Goldwater had attributed the 1952 win to the unpopularity of President Harry S. Truman and popular Wisconsin Senator Joseph McCarthy endorsing his campaign.

This would be McFarland's final run for statewide office.  He became an associate justice of the Arizona Supreme Court in 1965 and Chief Justice in 1968 before retiring from public service.

Republican primary

Candidates
 Barry Goldwater, incumbent U.S. Senator

Democratic primary

Candidates
 Ernest McFarland, Governor of Arizona, former U.S. Senator
 Stephen W. Langmade

Results

General election

See also 
 United States Senate elections, 1958

References

1958
Arizona
United States Senate
Barry Goldwater